Okalewka is a river of Poland, a tributary of the Skrwa Prawa near Skrwilno.

Rivers of Poland
Rivers of Kuyavian-Pomeranian Voivodeship